Jalal al-Din Mohammad Tabrizi, was an Iranian aristocrat, who served as the vizier of the Safavid king (shah) Ismail I (r. 1501–1524) from 1523 to 1524. 

A native of Tabriz, Jalal al-Din Mohammad belonged to the Iranian Kujuji family, and was the son of Amir Zakariya, the first vizier of the Safavid Empire. In 1523, Jalal al-Din Mohammad was appointed by Ismail as his vizier, but after Ismail's death in 1524, Jalal al-Din Mohammad was killed by a rebellious member of the Rumlu tribe, and was succeeded by Jafar Savaji.

References

Sources 
 

16th-century Iranian politicians
1524 deaths
Year of birth unknown
People from Tabriz
Assassinated Iranian people
Grand viziers of the Safavid Empire
Kujuji family
16th-century people of Safavid Iran